Diospyros confertiflora is a tree in the family Ebenaceae. The twigs dry to black. Inflorescences bear up to 12 flowers. The specific epithet  is from the Latin meaning "crowded flowers". Habitat is lowland forests. D. confertiflora is found in Peninsular Thailand, Sumatra, Peninsular Malaysia and Borneo.

References

confertiflora
Trees of Thailand
Trees of Sumatra
Trees of Peninsular Malaysia
Trees of Borneo
Plants described in 1873